Sidney West Graham is a mathematician interested in analytic number theory and professor at Central Michigan University. He received his Ph.D., which was supervised by Hugh Montgomery, from the University of Michigan in 1977. In his Ph.D. thesis he lowered the upper bound for Linnik's constant to 36 and subsequently reduced the bound further to 20.

References

External links
Sidney West Graham page at Central Michigan University

20th-century American mathematicians
21st-century American mathematicians
Number theorists
University of Michigan alumni
Living people
Central Michigan University faculty
1950 births